Saily Viart Despaigne (born 10 September 1995) is a Cuban athlete specialising in the shot put. She represented her country at the 2016 Summer Olympics in Rio de Janeiro without qualifying for the final.

Her personal best in the event is 17.94	metres set in Cali in 2016.

International competitions

References

1995 births
Living people
Cuban female shot putters
Athletes (track and field) at the 2015 Pan American Games
Athletes (track and field) at the 2016 Summer Olympics
Olympic athletes of Cuba
People from Ciego de Ávila
Pan American Games competitors for Cuba